

The 2021 Nürburgring 24 Hours (officially known as ADAC Total 24h Race at the Nürburgring Nordschleife for sponsorship reasons) was the 49th running of the Nürburgring 24 Hours and took place over 3–6 June 2021. The Manthey Racing Porsche 911 GT3 won the race with the Rowe Racing BMW M6 in second. Rowe Racing and BMW were the defending winners from the previous year's race.

The race was the shortest-ever in terms of both laps and run time, with the winner only completing fifty-nine laps in less than 10 hours of green- and yellow-flag running as a result of torrential rain and heavy fog. It included a large number of different classes of car, varying in speed from Group GT3 sport cars to a Dacia Logan. Of the 121 cars that started the race, ninety-nine finished.

Entry list

Race results

Entries in bold are class winners.
Drivers in italics were entered in cars that completed the race, however did not complete the required two laps to be classified as a finisher.

References

2021
Nürburgring 24 Hours
Nürburgring 24 Hours